Eleanor Percy, Duchess of Northumberland (1820–1911) was the wife of Algernon Percy, 4th Duke of Northumberland.

Biography
Elearnor was born on 22 October 1820, the daughter of Richard Grosvenor, 2nd Marquess of Westminster and Lady Elizabeth Mary Leveson-Gower. She married Lord Prudhoe (later 4th Duke of Northumberland) on 27 August 1842, and it was considered an excellent marriage since his older brother Hugh Percy, 3rd Duke of Northumberland was childless after 26 years of marriage. He was born 1792, and was thus 28 years her senior and 50 years old at the time of the marriage. Prudhoe succeeded to the title on 11 February 1847.

There were no children of the marriage. The Duchess was widowed on 12 February 1865, and died on 4 May 1911, aged 90, at Stanwick Park in Stanwick St John in the Richmondshire district of North Yorkshire.

For many details of her life see The Lost Stanwick Hall: remnants of the Duchess Eleanor of Northumberland, her time and people printed in Darlington, Co Durham in 2005. This was written as an accompaniment to an exhibition of her life after she was widowed during which time she was resident, for the most part, at Stanwick Hall, demolished in 1923. The entire contents are readable on the Stanwick St John Website, as are further articles on her life and her times in this small part of North Yorkshire.

References

1820 births
1911 deaths
Daughters of British marquesses
Eleanor
Eleanor Percy, Duchess of Northumberland